Spring Point Township is one of eight townships in Cumberland County, Illinois, USA.  As of the 2010 census, its population was 1,294 and it contained 461 housing units.

Geography

Cities, towns, villages
 Montrose (north quarter)

Unincorporated towns
 Lillyville at 
 Roslyn at

Cemeteries
The township contains these nine cemeteries: Brush Creek, Elliott, Faunce, Illinois Central Pioneer, Kingery, Lillyville, Mullen, Needham and Saint Rose.

Major highways
  Interstate 57
  Interstate 70
  U.S. Route 40
  Illinois Route 121

School districts
 Cumberland Community Unit School District 77
 Dieterich Community Unit School District 30
 Neoga Community Unit School District 3
 Teutopolis Community Unit School District 50

Political districts
 State House District 109
 State Senate District 55

References
 
 United States Census Bureau 2009 TIGER/Line Shapefiles
 United States National Atlas

External links
 City-Data.com
 Illinois State Archives
 Township Officials of Illinois

Adjacent townships 

Townships in Cumberland County, Illinois
Charleston–Mattoon, IL Micropolitan Statistical Area
1860 establishments in Illinois
Populated places established in 1860
Townships in Illinois